Where the Light Goes is the upcoming fifth studio album by American rock band Matchbox Twenty, scheduled for release on May 26, 2023, by Atlantic Records. On March 17, 2023, the band released the first single from the album, "Wild Dogs (Running in a Slow Dream)". It is the band's first album in over a decade since North in 2012.

It is their first album ever to not be produced by longtime producer Matt Serletic.

Track listing

References

Upcoming albums
Matchbox Twenty albums